General Sir William Charles Nicholls,  (25 February 1854 – 1 December 1935) was a Royal Marines officer who served as Adjutant-General Royal Marines.

Military career
Educated at Cheltenham College, Nicholls was commissioned into the Royal Marine Artillery on 15 July 1872. He saw action in South Africa in 1879 during the Anglo-Zulu War. He became Deputy Adjutant-General at Headquarters, Royal Marine Forces in June 1911. At that time the Deputy Adjutant-General was the professional head of the Royal Marines. His post was redesignated Adjutant-General Royal Marines in early 1914 shortly before the Gallipoli landings, in which the Royal Marine Forces took a prominent role, in June 1915 during the First World War. He retired in June 1916.

References

|-

 

1854 births
1935 deaths
People educated at Cheltenham College
Royal Marines generals
Knights Commander of the Order of the Bath
Royal Navy personnel of the Anglo-Zulu War
Royal Marines generals of World War I
People from Greenwich
Military personnel from London